Basic Concepts in Music Education is a landmark work published in 1958 as the Fifty-Seventh Yearbook of the National Society for the Study of Education. In 1954, the Music Educators National Conference (MENC) had formed its Commission on Basic Concepts in an attempt to seek a more soundly-based philosophical foundation. The work of the commission resulted in the publication of Basic Concepts, which advocated an aesthetic justification for music education. According to the aesthetic philosophy, music education should be justified for its own sake rather than for its extra-musical benefits.

Contents

Section I: Disciplinary Backgrounds
Therber H. Madison, The Need for New Concepts in Music Education
Foster McMurray, Pragmatism in Music Education 
Harry S. Broudy, A Realistic Philosophy of Music Education
John H. Mueller, Music and Education: A Sociological Approach
George Frederick McKay, The Range of Musical Experience
James Mursell, Growth Processes in Music Education 
Louis P. Thorpe, Learning Theory and Music Teaching
Allen Britton, Music in Early American Public Education: A Historical Critique

Section II: Music in Schools
C.A. Burnmeister, The Role of Music in General Education
Robert House, Curriculum Construction in Music Education
William C. Hartshorn, The Role of Listening
E. Thayer Gaston, Functional Music
Charles Leonhard, Evaluation in Music Education
Oletta A. Benn, A Message for New Teachers

Basic Concepts II
Richard Colwell edited Basic Concepts in Music Education II in 1991. This volume included updates from the living authors of the original volume as well as new contributions from leaders in the field.

References
Henry, N. B. (Ed.). (1958). Basic Concepts in Music Education. Chicago, IL: University of Chicago Press.

Mark, M. L., & Gary, C. L. (1999). A history of American music education (2nd ed.). Reston, VA: MENC—The National Association for Music Education.

Music education
1954 non-fiction books